Cha Cha Cha was the third and last studio album of the nineties by English rock band EMF, released in 1995 under the EMI label.

Critical reception
Trouser Press wrote that "flashes of EMF’s early techno-pop sound surface in 'Bleeding You Dry,' by far the most listenable track on 1995’s Cha Cha Cha. Almost every other cut on this would-be comeback, however, finds the band groping-unsuccessfully — for some new musical direction."

Track listing
 "Perfect Day"
 "La Plage"
 "The Day I Was Born"
 "Secrets"
 "Shining"
 "Bring Me Down"
 "Skin"
 "Slouch"
 "Bleeding You Dry"
 "Patterns"
 "When Will You Come"
 "West of the Cox"
 "Ballad O' the Bishop"
 "Glass Smash Jack"

Japanese bonus track
"Angel"

References

1995 albums
EMF (band) albums
Parlophone albums
Albums produced by Jonny Dollar